St. Joseph Cemetery (or St. Joseph's Cemetery) is a Catholic cemetery located just outside Auburn, New York in the town of Fleming, New York. Former big league baseball player Tug Arundel is buried there.

References

Roman Catholic cemeteries in New York (state)
St. Joseph Cemetery